"The Pick" is the 53rd episode of the sitcom Seinfeld. It is the 13th episode of the fourth season, and first aired on December 16, 1992. In this episode, Elaine mistakenly mails out a Christmas card in which her nipple is exposed to all her friends and relatives, Jerry's girlfriend breaks up with him after she sees him seemingly pick his nose, and Kramer is angered when he learns Calvin Klein has put out a new perfume based on his idea for a perfume that smells like the beach.

Plot 
Elaine is humiliated when her Christmas card photo taken by Kramer accidentally exposes her nipple. The exposure is subtle enough that no one notices it until after Elaine has mailed out the Christmas card to all of her friends and relatives, including her underage nephew and her morally conservative boyfriend. Jerry has a date with Tia Van Camp, the Calvin Klein model he met on the plane in the previous episode. After the date, Kramer identifies the perfume Tia is wearing as the one he pitched to a Calvin Klein representative in "The Pez Dispenser", called "The Beach". She tells him it is a new Calvin Klein product called "Ocean".

Tia dumps Jerry after witnessing him scratching his nose, which she mistakes for him picking his nose. Jerry attempts to explain his actions at the Calvin Klein office but Tia refuses to believe him. Jerry launches into a rant about how people who pick their noses should not be socially ostracized, with references to The Merchant of Venice and The Elephant Man. Elaine delivers a similar speech to her boyfriend when he breaks up with her over the nipple exposure.

George visits a therapist to discuss his breakup with Susan, but the session is unproductive as first George, and then also the therapist, obsess over the stuck zipper on George's jacket. George convinces Susan to get back together with him by citing the example of Louis Pasteur and his wife. Upon their reconciliation he again feels entrapped by the relationship, so he uses "the pick" to disgust her enough to break up with him again. Kramer confronts Calvin Klein to complain about "Ocean", and is instead asked to be an underwear model. In the first advertisement to feature Kramer, his genitals are accidentally exposed.

References

External links
 

Seinfeld (season 4) episodes
1992 American television episodes
American Christmas television episodes
Television episodes written by Larry David